was a Japanese football player and manager. He played for Japan national team.

Club career
Ikoma was born in Hyogo Prefecture on August 25, 1932. When he was a Kwansei Gakuin University student, he won 1953 and 1955 Emperor's Cup as a member of All Kwangaku was consisted of his alma mater Kwansei Gakuin University players and graduates. After graduating from university, he joined Mitsubishi Motors in 1955. In 1965,  joined new league Japan Soccer League. He did not play in the league. He retired in 1966.

National team career
On January 2, 1955, when Ikoma was a Kwansei Gakuin University student, he debuted for Japan national team against Burma. He played 5 games for Japan in 1955.

Coaching career
In 1966, when Ikoma played for Mitsubishi Motors, he became a playing manager and managed the club 1 season. End of 1966 season, he resigned as manager and retired from playing career.

On April 27, 2009, Ikoma died in Kobe at the age of 76.

Club statistics

National team statistics

References

External links
 
 Japan National Football Team Database

1932 births
2009 deaths
Kwansei Gakuin University alumni
Association football people from Hyōgo Prefecture
Japanese footballers
Japan international footballers
Japan Soccer League players
Urawa Red Diamonds players
Japanese football managers
Association football goalkeepers